The following is a list of programs which have been broadcast on The WB 100+ Station Group, a specialized programming service feed that operated from September 1998 to September 2006 and was distributed mainly to media markets ranked above #100 by Nielsen, which provided a master schedule of network content from parent television network The WB and acquired programs distributed for syndication that filled time periods not allocated to network programming (some of which were subsequently acquired by successor service The CW Plus, following the announcement of The CW's launch and the shutdowns of The WB and UPN).

Former programming

Dramas

Comedies

Reality/other

Children's programming

See also
 List of programs broadcast by The WB
 List of programs broadcast by Kids' WB 
 List of programs broadcast by The CW Plus

References

WB 100+